Inga pallida is a species of  plant in the family Fabaceae. It is found only in Bolivia.

References

pallida
Flora of Bolivia
Vulnerable plants
Taxonomy articles created by Polbot